Los Pinos, New Mexico is a ghost town in what is now Bosque Farms, New Mexico in Valencia County, New Mexico.

Los Pinos was a Spanish land grant dating from 1716, originally known as Bosque del Pino (Forest Pines), or Los Pinos.

External links
Los Pinos
 Bosque Farms, New Mexico

1716 establishments in New Spain
Ghost towns in New Mexico